The 1998 Chattanooga Mocs football team represented the University of Tennessee at Chattanooga as a member of the Southern Conference (SoCon) in the 1998 NCAA Division I-AA football season. The Mocs were led by fifth-year head coach Buddy Green and played their home games at Finley Stadium. They finished the season 5–6 overall and 4–4 in SoCon play to tie for fourth place.

Schedule

References

Chattanooga
Chattanooga Mocs football seasons
Chattanooga Mocs football